The western giant plated lizard (Matobosaurus maltzahni) is a species of lizard in the Gerrhosauridae family.
It is found in Angola and Namibia.

References

Matobosaurus
Reptiles described in 1938